Tinantia is a genus of plants in the Commelinaceae, first described in 1839. They are commonly called widow's tears or false dayflowers due to their resemblance of the closely related true dayflowers of the genus Commelina. Tinantia is native to North and South America from Texas + Hispaniola to Argentina, with a center of diversity from Mexico to Nicaragua.  Tinantia pringlei, an alpine native of Mexico, is grown as an ornamental in temperate areas and is also a common greenhouse weed.

The genus was named in honour of François Tinant, a Luxembourger forester.

 Species
 Tinantia anomala (Torr.) C.B.Clarke - Texas, Durango
 Tinantia caribaea Urb. - Lesser Antilles, Trinidad & Tobago, Colombia
 Tinantia erecta (Jacq.) Fenzl - widespread from central Mexico to Argentina; naturalized in Azores, Madeira, Java, Angola, northern India
 Tinantia glabra (Standl. & Steyerm.) Rohweder - southern Mexico, Costa Rica, El Salvador, Guatemala, Venezuela 
 Tinantia leiocalyx C.B.Clarke ex J.D.Sm. - central + southern Mexico, Central America, Colombia, Venezuela
 Tinantia longipedunculata Standl. & Steyerm. - central + southern Mexico, Central America
 Tinantia macrophylla S.Wats. - Chihuahua, Sonora, Sinaloa, Durango, Jalisco
 Tinantia parviflora Rohweder - central + southern Mexico, Central America, Colombia
 Tinantia pringlei (S.Watson) Rohweder - Tamaulipas, Nuevo León
 Tinantia sprucei C.B.Clarke - Trinidad & Tobago, Venezuela, Brazil
 Tinantia standleyi Steyerm. - central + southern Mexico, Central America, Colombia, Ecuador, Peru, southern Brazil
 Tinantia umbellata (Vahl) Urb. - Guyana, Venezuela
 Tinantia violacea Rohweder - southern Mexico, Central America

References

External links
 Lady Bird Johnson Wildflower Center, University of Texas
 Flowers by the Sea

Commelinaceae
Commelinales genera